The Kosovo Judo Federation ( or FXhK) is the official governing body for the sport of judo in Kosovo. In 2012, it was accepted into the International Judo Federation and the European Judo Union.

Judo in Kosovo
As of June 2020, there were 16 member clubs including 813 male and 263 female judoka.

References

External links
 

Sports governing bodies in Kosovo
Judo organizations